Phil Gladwin is a television writer and script editor. He created the screenwriting website and platform Screenwriting Goldmine, designed to help train young screenwriters and provide them with key resources relating to craft and business. He set it up, following frustrations with conventional screenwriting teaching and practices.

Life 
He was born in Grimsby in 1963. As a teenager, Gladwin wrote lyrics and entered a short story contest. Following an attempt to write novels, Gladwin served as script editor on  The Bill, Casualty, Berkeley Square and Trance, before later moving onto screenwriting as a full-time career.

Written work 
 Grange Hill
 The Bill
 Soft Talking - 2000
 Real Crime - 2001
 Eye of the Lens - 2001
 Liquid City - 2001
 006 - 2002
 057 - 2002
 085 - 2003
 127 - 2003
 Crossroads - 2001
 If....
 If... The Toxic Timebomb Goes Off - 2005
 Holby City
 Actions Speak Louder - 2005
 Trial and Retribution XIII: Curriculum Vitae - 2007
 The Sarah Jane Adventures
 Warriors of Kudlak, Part one and two - 2007

References

External links 

Phil Gladwin's blog
Phil Gladwin's tutorial package on how to write screenplays

Living people
1963 births
British television writers
British soap opera writers
English television writers
English screenwriters
English male screenwriters
English children's writers
British male television writers
British bloggers
Screenwriting instructors
Male bloggers
21st-century British screenwriters
21st-century English male writers